Herbert Birchby Warburton (September 21, 1916 – July 30, 1983) was an American lawyer and politician from Wilmington, in New Castle County, Delaware and Frankford, in Sussex County, Delaware. He was a veteran of World War II, and a member of the Republican Party, who served as U.S. Representative from Delaware.

Early life and family
Warburton was born in Wilmington, Delaware. He attended the public schools of Wilmington, and Reading, Pennsylvania, and graduated from the University of Delaware in Newark, Delaware in 1938, and from Dickinson School of Law in Carlisle, Pennsylvania in 1941.

An ROTC graduate from the University of Delaware, he was commissioned a second lieutenant, and began active Army duty as first lieutenant of the One Hundred and Twenty-second Antiaircraft Battalion in September 1941. After graduation from the Command and General Staff School at Fort Leavenworth, Kansas in September 1945 he served as a battalion commander until relieved from active duty as a major in December 1945.

Professional and political career
Warburton was admitted to the Delaware Bar in absentia in 1942 and began a practice following his return from the Army in 1946. He served as city solicitor for Wilmington, Delaware from 1949 until 1952. Warburton was elected to the U.S. House of Representatives in 1952, defeating Democrat Joseph J. Scannell. He served in the Republican majority in the 83rd Congress. In 1954 he did not seek another term in the U.S. House, but unsuccessfully sought the United States Senate seat of incumbent Democrat J. Allen Frear, Jr. In all, Warburton served from January 3, 1953 until January 3, 1955, all but the first 17 days falling during the administration of U.S. President Dwight D. Eisenhower.

Following his congressional service, Warburton was appointed special assistant to United States Secretary of Labor, James P. Mitchell from 1955 until 1957, general counsel for the Post Office Department from 1957 until 1961, and minority counsel to the U.S. House Government Operations subcommittee, serving there from 1961 to 1964. Subsequently, he became a resident of Frankford, Delaware and was executive director of the American Orthotics and Prosthetics Association and the American Board for Certification in Orthotics and Prosthetics.

Death and legacy
Warburton died in Lewes, Delaware.

Almanac
Elections are held the first Tuesday after November 1. U.S. Representatives take office January 3 and have a two-year term.

{|class=wikitable style="width: 94%" style="text-align: center;" align="center"
|-bgcolor=#cccccc
!colspan=7 style="background: #ccccff;" |Public Offices
|-
! Office
! Type
! Location
! Began office
! Ended office
! notes 
|- 
|U.S. Representative
|Legislature 
|Washington
|January 3, 1953 
|January 3, 1955
|

{|class=wikitable style="width: 94%" style="text-align: center;" align="center"
|-bgcolor=#cccccc
!colspan=7 style="background: #ccccff;" |United States Congressional service
|-
! Dates
! Congress
! Chamber
! Majority
! President
! Committees
! Class/District
|-
|1953–1955
|83rd
|U.S. House
|Republican
|Dwight D. Eisenhower
|
|at-large

{|class=wikitable style="width: 94%" style="text-align: center;" align="center"
|-bgcolor=#cccccc
!colspan=12 style="background: #ccccff;" |Election results
|-
!Year
!Office
!
!Subject
!Party
!Votes
!%
!
!Opponent
!Party
!Votes
!%
|-
|1952
|U.S. Representative
|
| |Herbert B. Warburton
| |Republican
| |88,285
| |52%
|
| |Joseph J. Scannell
| |Democratic
| |81,730
| |48%
|-
|1954
|U.S. Senator
|
| |Herbert B. Warburton
| |Republican
| |62,389
| |43%
|
| |J. Allen Frear, Jr.
| |Democratic
| |82,511
| |57%
|-

External links
Biographical Directory of the United States Congress   
Delaware’s Members of Congress
Find A Grave
Political Graveyard

1916 births
1983 deaths
People from Wilmington, Delaware
University of Delaware alumni
Dickinson School of Law alumni
United States Army personnel of World War II
Delaware lawyers
Burials in Sussex County, Delaware
Republican Party members of the United States House of Representatives from Delaware
20th-century American lawyers
20th-century American politicians
United States Army officers